Lovability may refer to:

 Lovability (company), a company that designs, manufactures, and markets condoms
 Lovability (album), a 2011 album by ZE:A